Scopula pseudophema is a moth of the  family Geometridae. It is found in Ivory Coast, Sierra Leone and Sudan.

The wingspan is 20–21 mm. The head and body are concolorous with the wings. The forewings are whitish ochreous, in places tinged with rather deeper ochreous.

References

Moths described in 1920
pseudophema
Moths of Africa
Insects of West Africa